Nika Khanjani, is an Iranian-Canadian writer and video artist based in Montreal. She is a follower of the Baháʼí Faith. She began making short experimental and essay films in 2006.  Her titles include Free World Pens (2015), Iran to Texas (2011), Texas, My Brother, and Me (2009), Current (2007), Copyright (2006), and Montreal spring, shrouded in mist (2012).

She explores her own memories and family history to explore broader themes of displacement and social struggle. The autobiographic poetics of her films are often contrasted with imagery of empty or sparsely populated spaces and layered soundscapes.

"The Khanjani family moved to Texas from Iran in 1979, just before the revolution. They soon felt the sting of racism as the Iran hostage crisis (dramatized in the 2012 film Argo) took hold of the American imagination."

Khanjani studied English literature at the University of Texas. She moved to New York City in the late 1990s, where she worked for the Brooklyn Film Festival. She then returned to Iran for a couple of years to teach at the "underground university" — the Baháʼí Institute for Higher Education, a school for members of the oppressed faith, Iran's largest religious minority.

References

External links

Iranian women artists
Iranian women writers
Living people
University of Texas at Austin College of Liberal Arts alumni
Year of birth missing (living people)